Paul Pierné (30 June 1874 – 24 March 1952) was a French composer and organist.

Career
Born in Metz, he was a cousin of composer and organist Gabriel Pierné. His first musical lessons were from his father Charles, himself a former student of César Franck. Pierné later studied at the Conservatoire de Paris under Georges Caussade and Charles Lenepveu. He received a mention in the 1903 Prix de Rome, and took second place in the competition in 1904.

He served as organist at St-Paul-St-Louis Church in Paris, succeeding his father in the position in 1905 until his own death in Paris 1952.

His compositional output was wide-ranging, including two operas, several ballets, two symphonies, a number of orchestral tone poems, and chamber music, as well as large-form religious works, including two masses, an oratorio, and several smaller choral and organ works.

External links
"Prix de Rome 1900-1909": biography

1874 births
1952 deaths
20th-century classical composers
20th-century French composers
20th-century French male musicians
20th-century organists
Conservatoire de Paris alumni
French ballet composers
French classical organists
French composers of sacred music
French male classical composers
French male organists
French opera composers
Male opera composers
Musicians from Metz
Prix de Rome for composition
Male classical organists